Mumper is an unincorporated community in Garden County, Nebraska, United States.

History
Mumper was named for a female pioneer settler.

A post office was established in Mumper in 1896, and remained in operation until it was discontinued in 1943.

References

Unincorporated communities in Garden County, Nebraska
Unincorporated communities in Nebraska